This is the list of women who have served as speakers and leaders of federal, state and territorial legislatures in the United States.

Congress

State

Territorial and the District of Columbia

Notes

References

Speaker
Speakers of state legislatures in the United States
 United States